Kenneth Glenn Suesens (October 23, 1916 – May 29, 1992) was the head coach of the Sheboygan Red Skins of the National Basketball Association from 1948 to 1951. Under him, they would go 1–2 in the playoffs. He was born in Des Moines, Iowa to John F. Suesens and Martha Duran.

References

1916 births
1992 deaths
American men's basketball players
Basketball coaches from Iowa
Basketball players from Iowa
College golf coaches in the United States
Guards (basketball)
Iowa Hawkeyes men's basketball players
Sheboygan Red Skins coaches
Sheboygan Red Skins players
Valparaiso Beacons coaches
Valparaiso Beacons men's basketball coaches